Barbara Blatter (born 22 December 1970) is a Swiss mountain biker. She won the silver medal in  Mountainbike in 2000 Summer Olympics.

References 

1970 births
Living people
Cyclists at the 2000 Summer Olympics
Cyclists at the 2004 Summer Olympics
Olympic cyclists of Switzerland
Olympic silver medalists for Switzerland
Swiss female cyclists
Olympic medalists in cycling
Sportspeople from the canton of St. Gallen
Medalists at the 2000 Summer Olympics
21st-century Swiss women